Castiglione dei Pepoli is a comune (municipality) in the Metropolitan City of Bologna, Emilia-Romagna, Italy, located about  southwest of Bologna.

It takes its name from the Pepoli noble family of Bologna.

Asteroid 400193 Castión was named after the city by its dialectal name. The official  was published by the Minor Planet Center on 25 September 2018.

International relations 

Castiglione dei Pepoli is twinned with:
  Nogent-sur-Marne, France

References

External links 
 

Cities and towns in Emilia-Romagna